Galle International College (GIC) is an international school in Galle, Sri Lanka, serving ages 2–18.

Academics
Students sit for the IGCSE and GCE O Levels, which are overseen by the Cambridge International Examinations, a division of Cambridge Assessment (UCLES). It is the first fully accredited Cambridge school in southern Sri Lanka.

Fees
Admission fees range from Rs 45,000 to Rs 75,000.  Tuition fees for the year range from Rs 97,500 to Rs 336,000.

Notes

External links

 Galle International College

Schools in Galle
International schools in Sri Lanka